The Best of Lynn Anderson: Memories and Desires is a studio album by American country artist Lynn Anderson. It was released in 1982 via Era Records.Internationally, the album was released on the K-tel distribution company. Although labeled as "The Best of," the album was actually a studio release but it contained re-recordings of songs Anderson first cut in years prior for other labels. Many of the songs on the project were re-recordings of songs she has first cut for other labels. Previously unrecorded tracks were also included on the project.

Background and content
Anderson recorded Memories and Desires for the K-tel company, a label that produced re-recorded music for veteran artists and performers. This music was also occasionally marked on television. The Best of Lynn Anderson: Memories and Desires was recorded in 1982 in Nashville, Tennessee. The album was a collection of 16 tracks, ten of which were re-recordings of Anderson's biggest hits. This included "Rose Garden," "Top of the World," "You're My Man" and "Cry." In addition, six tracks were new recordings to Anderson's discography. These songs were cover versions of songs first made famous by other music artists. Covers included two songs by The Carpenters, Dusty Springfield's "You Don't Have to Say You Love Me" and Gladys Knight & the Pips's "Midnight Train to Georgia."

Release and controversy
The Best of Lynn Anderson: Memories and Desires was released in 1982 via Era Records, a subdivision of the K-Tel distributing company.  It was released as a vinyl LP, containing eight songs on each side of the record. In Canada, the album was issued as an audio cassette, containing the same track format for each side of the tape.

The record did not reach any chart positions on Billboard upon its release. This included the Top Country Albums chart. Anderson's cover of "Midnight Train to Georgia" was the only single spawned from the project. Anderson objected to the original release of the single and took legal action to stop the promotion of the song. A settlement was eventually reached in December 1982 that called for no other singles to be released from the package.

Track listing

Personnel
All credits are adapted from the vinyl insert information of the original album.

 Lynn Anderson – lead vocals

Release history

Notes

References

1982 albums
K-tel albums
Lynn Anderson albums